The Southwest Minnesota State Mustangs (also SMSU Mustangs and formerly Southwest State Mustangs) are the athletic teams that represent Southwest Minnesota State University, located in Marshall, Minnesota, in NCAA Division II intercollegiate sports. The Mustangs compete as members of the Northern Sun Intercollegiate Conference for all 14 varsity sports. SMSU has been competing since 1969, but has been a part of the conference since the Northern Intercollegiate Conference and the Northern Sun Conference merged to form the NSIC in 1992.

Varsity teams

List of teams

Men's sports
 Baseball
 Basketball
 Cross Country
 Football
 Track & Field
 Wheelchair Basketball
 Wrestling

Women's sports
 Basketball
 Cross Country
 Golf
 Soccer
 Softball
 Tennis
 Track & Field
 Volleyball

Sports culture
The student booster club for basketball is the Mustang Maniacs. Their slogan is, "Our team loves us and our opponents fear us". An annual basketball tradition is Hawaiian Night, which usually coincides with the Winter Meltdown festival held during the second week of the Spring Semester (which lasts from early January through early May).

Non-varsity sports

Intramural sports
Intramural sports include badminton, basketball, flag football, floor hockey, broomball, racquetball, softball, tennis, ultimate Frisbee, and volleyball. The Mustang Rugby Club competes in the Minnesota Rugby Union (USA Rugby) and won the Minnesota Division III Championship in 2002. Recently the Mustangs Rugby Club won the Minnesota Division IIIB championship in 2010.

References

External links